Sakaya (also Saccaya or Sak-ka-ya) is a former Sierra Miwok or Mono Native American settlement within the Sierra Nevada of Mariposa County, California, United States.

Sakaya was located west of Sentinel Rock near the Merced River in Yosemite Valley, in present-day Yosemite National Park.

References

See also
Native American history of California

Miwok villages
Former Native American populated places in the Sierra Nevada (United States)
Former settlements in Mariposa County, California
Yosemite National Park
Former Native American populated places in California